The Icelandic records in swimming are the fastest-ever performances by an Iceland swimmer. The records are recognised and ratified by the Icelandic Swimming Association (Sundsamband Íslands - SSÍ). SSÍ maintains records in both long course (50m) and short course (25m) pools, in the following distances and strokes:
freestyle (in Icelandic= skrið): 50, 100, 200, 400, 800 and 1500.
backstroke (bak):  50, 100 and 200.
breaststroke (bringa): 50, 100 and 200.
butterfly (flug): 50, 100 and 200.
Individual Medley (fjór): 100 (25m only), 200 and 400.
relays (boðsund): 4x50 free (25m only), 4x100 free, 4x200 free, 4x50 medley (25m only), and 4x100 medley. (Club and national team categories for all.)
Note: fjór is Icelandic for "four". Also, the stroke order in the SSÍ report has breast before back.

All records were set in finals unless noted otherwise.

Long Course (50m)

Men

 

|-bgcolor=#DDDDDD
|colspan=9|
|-

|-bgcolor=#DDDDDD
|colspan=9|
|-

|-bgcolor=#DDDDDD
|colspan=9|
|-

|-bgcolor=#DDDDDD
|colspan=9|
|-

|-bgcolor=#DDDDDD
|colspan=9|
|-

Women

|-bgcolor=#DDDDDD
|colspan=9|
|-

|-bgcolor=#DDDDDD
|colspan=9|
|-

|-bgcolor=#DDDDDD
|colspan=9|
|-

|-bgcolor=#DDDDDD
|colspan=9|
|-

|-bgcolor=#DDDDDD
|colspan=9|
|-

Mixed relay

Short Course (25m)

Men

|-bgcolor=#DDDDDD
|colspan=9|
|-

|-bgcolor=#DDDDDD
|colspan=9|
|-

|-bgcolor=#DDDDDD
|colspan=9|
|-

|-bgcolor=#DDDDDD
|colspan=9|
|-

|-bgcolor=#DDDDDD
|colspan=9|
|-

Women

|-bgcolor=#DDDDDD
|colspan=9|
|-

|-bgcolor=#DDDDDD
|colspan=9|
|-

|-bgcolor=#DDDDDD
|colspan=9|
|-

|-bgcolor=#DDDDDD
|colspan=9|
|-

|-bgcolor=#DDDDDD
|colspan=9|
|-

Mixed relay

References

External links
Icelandic Swimming Association web site
Icelandic Records swimrankings.net 18 December 2022 updated

Iceland
Records
Swimming
Swimming